Louison Bobet, a line of bicycles produced by french bicycle manufacturer mercier for French cyclist Louison Bobet following his cycling career.

See also
 French bicycle industry

Cycle manufacturers of France
French brands